Joaquín Casalduero Martí (23 April 1903, Barcelona - 22 February 1990, Madrid) was a Spanish professor and literary critic. He won a 1944 Guggenheim Fellowship.  He was a member of the Generation of '27 with Pedro Salinas and Jorge Guillén. He taught in exile in the United States and a variety of countries across Europe.

Life 
He graduated from the Universidad de Madrid, where he was a student of Ramón Menéndez Pidal. In Europe, he taught at the University of Strasburg, University of Marburg, University of Cambridge and Oxford University. In the United States, he taught at Smith College, Middlebury College, the University of Wisconsin, New York University, and University of California, San Diego.

He edited a collected works of Benito Pérez Gadós.

A street in Los Angeles was named for him.

Works 

 Poema que se llama (71 poemas), 1964.
 Por fin sin esperanza, 1971.
 Roca viva
 Poema sin título

References 

1903 births
1990 deaths
Spanish academics
Spanish literary critics
Generation of '27
Complutense University of Madrid alumni
Academic staff of the University of Strasbourg
Academic staff of the University of Marburg
Academics of the University of Cambridge
Academics of the University of Oxford
20th-century Spanish male writers
20th-century Spanish non-fiction writers
Smith College faculty
Middlebury College faculty
University of Wisconsin–Madison faculty
New York University faculty
University of California, San Diego faculty